Baron Birdwood, of Anzac and of Totnes in the County of Devon, was a title in the Peerage of the United Kingdom.

It was created on 25 January 1938 for Sir William Birdwood, 1st Baronet. He is chiefly remembered as the commander of the Australian and New Zealand Army Corps (ANZAC) during the Gallipoli Campaign of 1915. Birdwood had already been created a Baronet, of Anzac and Totnes, on 29 December 1919.

The first two barons had only one son each; on the death of the 3rd Baron without male issue in 2015, the barony and baronetcy became extinct.

The politician Jane Birdwood, Baroness Birdwood, was the second wife of the second Baron.

Barons Birdwood (1938)
William Riddell Birdwood, 1st Baron Birdwood (1865–1951)
Christopher Bromhead Birdwood, 2nd Baron Birdwood (1899–1962)
Mark William Ogilvie Birdwood, 3rd Baron Birdwood (1938–2015)

Coat of arms

References

Extinct baronies in the Peerage of the United Kingdom
Noble titles created in 1938